The 33rd District of the Iowa House of Representatives in the state of Iowa.

Current elected officials
Brian Meyer is the representative currently representing the district.

Past representatives
The district has previously been represented by:
 Sonja Egenes, 1971–1973
 Henry C. Wulff, 1973–1977
 Thomas A. Lind, 1977–1983
 Donald J. Knapp, 1983–1993
 Joseph L. Ertl, 1993–1997
 Paul Scherrman, 1997–2003
 Dick Taylor, 2003–2009
 Kirsten Running-Marquardt, 2009–2013
 Kevin McCarthy, 2013–2013
 Brian Meyer, 2013–present

References

033